Charlie Biederman (November 11, 1918February 22, 1995) was a musher in Alaska best known for being the last surviving dog sled mail carrier in the United States. Charlie was born in Alaska as the son of Ed Biederman, a musher born in Bohemia who immigrated to the United States in 1874 and also delivered the mail via dog sled. The date of Charlie's birth is unclear, but contemporary U.S. Censuses indicate it likely was around 1919. Charlie had four siblings. Charlie was raised in Eagle, Alaska, but lived in an isolated cabin on the Yukon River for most of his life. From an early age, he assisted his father and brother in their winter deliveries of the mail to isolated cabins in central Alaska. In winter, the family lived in Eagle and ran the mail route between that town and Circle, another small settlement approximately  downriver. In the summer, the family lived at their Yukon River cabin, harvesting fish for subsistence and boarding the dogs of fellow mushers. In 1938, the family were underbid for the main contract for mail delivery in the area by a bush pilot. Ed Biederman retired shortly afterward and died in 1945. The final dog sled mail route was replaced in 1963. That final route was from Gambell to Savoonga and was run by Chester Noongwook. In January 1995, he donated the mail-delivery sled he used to the National Postal Museum in Washington, D.C., where it hangs today. One month after making the delivery, he died on February 22, 1995.

Today, the cabin that served as Charlie Biederman's home for most of his life is a hospitality stop of the Yukon Quest, a 1,000-mile sled dog race between Whitehorse, Yukon, and Fairbanks, Alaska.

Notes

References 
Balzar, John. Yukon Alone: The World's Toughest Adventure Race. Henry Holt and Co, January 2000. pp. 169–170.
Historic American Buildings Survey. "Ed Biederman Fish Camp" (PDF), National Park Service. Accessed March 11, 2009.
Killick, Adam. Racing the White Silence: On the Trail of the Yukon Quest. Penguin Global, May 2005. pp. 225–226

External links
 Biographical audio interviews of Charlie Biederman

1918 births
1995 deaths
Alaskan Athabaskan people
Dog mushers from Alaska